Jeron Slusher (born 7 November 1944) is a Guatemalan footballer. He competed in the men's tournament at the 1968 Summer Olympics.

References

External links
 

1944 births
Living people
Guatemalan footballers
Guatemala international footballers
Olympic footballers of Guatemala
Footballers at the 1968 Summer Olympics
People from Izabal Department
Association football forwards